Jon Abrahamsen (born 8 May 1951) is a former Norwegian football goalkeeper known for his time at FK Bodø/Glimt (played over 300 games 1975-81 in the Norwegian First Division) where he won the Norwegian Football Cup 1975. He played for Norway (3 caps in 1981) under Tor Røste Fossen. Abrahamsen was named in the Press team of the year in 1975 and named by VG as Keeper of the year in 1980. Today he is a technical advisor for Widerøe.

References

External links 

Norwegian footballers
FK Mjølner players
FK Bodø/Glimt players
Norway international footballers
1951 births
Living people
Association football goalkeepers
Sportspeople from Bodø
People from Vardø